American Studies in Scandinavia is a biannual peer-reviewed, academic journal covering American studies, especially from the Scandinavian countries. It was established in 1968 and is published by the University Press of Southern Denmark. The journal is sponsored by the Nordic Association for American Studies and the Nordic Publications Committee for Humanist Periodicals. The current editor-in-chief is Janne Lahti (University of Helsinki).

Abstracting and indexing
The journal is abstracted and indexed in the Arts & Humanities Citation Index, Current Contents/Arts & Humanities, and Scopus.

References

External links

American studies journals
English-language journals
Publications established in 1968
Biannual journals
Open access journals